The Chinchipe spinetail (Synallaxis chinchipensis) is a species of bird in the family Furnariidae, the ovenbirds. It is endemic to Peru.

Taxonomy and systematics

Before early 2021, the Chinchipe spinetail was considered a subspecies of necklaced spinetail (Synallaxis stictothorax). Several publications beginning in 2010 described the morphological, vocal, and phylogenetic differences between them. Based on that evidence, the South American Classification Committee of the American Ornithological Society and the International Ornithological Congress elevated it to species rank in January 2021.

Description

Adult male and female Chinchipe spinetails are alike. The top of the head and the back are olive green, the rump is cinnamon brown, the lower flanks are grayish brown, and the tail is long and brown with reddish outer feathers. It has a pale supercilium ("eyebrow"), a white throat, and an upper breast spotted with brown. The juvenile plumage has not been described.

Distribution and habitat

The Chinchipe spinetail is found only in northwestern Peru, in the drainages of Río Marañón and Río Chinchipe.

Behavior and ecology

The Chinchipe spinetail's principal foods are arthropods and arthropod larvae. The Chinchipe spinetail does not migrate. Its breeding phenology has not been described.

Status

Though the Chinchipe spinetail's population size has not been determined, it is believed to be stable. BirdLife International has rated the species as being of Least Concern. It appears to tolerate some habitat degradation.

References

Chinchipe spinetail
Birds of Peru
Chinchipe spinetail